
Bow Peak is a  mountain summit located in the Bow River valley of Banff National Park, in the Canadian Rockies of Alberta, Canada. Its nearest higher peak is Crowfoot Mountain,  to the east. Bow Peak is situated north of Hector Lake, southeast of Bow Lake, and can be seen from the Icefields Parkway. Although not of remarkable elevation, the mountain is a conspicuous landmark and visible from as far away as the Lake Louise area. Its position in the Waputik Mountains provides magnificent views from the summit.

History
Bow Peak was named in 1922 for its proximity to the headwaters of the Bow River which was known by the Cree as "The place from which bows are taken." The mountain's name became official in 1924 by the Geographical Names Board of Canada.

Geology
Like other mountains in Banff Park, Bow Peak is composed of sedimentary rock laid down during the Precambrian to Jurassic periods. Formed in shallow seas, this sedimentary rock was pushed east and over the top of younger rock during the Laramide orogeny.

Climate
Based on the Köppen climate classification, Bow Peak is located in a subarctic climate zone with cold, snowy winters, and mild summers.

Gallery

See also
Geography of Alberta
Geology of Alberta

References

External links
 Parks Canada web site: Banff National Park
 Andromache, Hector, Bow, Crowfoot panorama: Flickr photo
 PBase photo: Bow Peak - Icefields Parkway
 Weather: Bow Peak

Two-thousanders of Alberta
Mountains of Banff National Park
Alberta's Rockies